The Shanghai International Football Tournament (SIFT) is an annual football event in China that has been hosted and organized by the municipal government of Shanghai since 1991. The tournament usually consists of two double-header evenings featuring all four clubs.

History
After the first event in 1991, SIFT was held every year until 2001, when it took a four-year break. Its sponsors before this time included Marlboro, Guanshenyuan, Fushoutong, Huili and Budweiser.

In 2005, the tournament was revived by USSM, a sports marketing company, featuring three Spanish La Liga teams (Villarreal, Sevilla, and Real Zaragoza) as well as Shanghai United, a dream team chosen by a public vote.

SIFT 2006 featured three international clubs - Manchester United, Atlético Madrid and Kashima Antlers - competing against a China Super League club, Shanghai Shenhua FC, in the Shanghai Hong Kou Stadium. The TV broadcast of the 2006 event was shown in 115 countries around the world.

See also
Football in China

External links
Shanghai International Tournament at RSSSF

Sports competitions in Shanghai
Chinese football friendly trophies
Football in Shanghai